Prem Vivah is a 1979 Indian Hindi-language film directed by Basu Chatterjee and produced by Ramraj Nahta, starring Mithun Chakraborty, Bindiya Goswami, Utpal Dutt and Asha Parekh.

Plot

Asha Parekh plays an unmarried woman in her 30s, past what society considered the marriageable age.  Her younger sister played by Bindiya Goswami has a fiancée Mithun Chakraborty.  She feels guilty that she is about to have a happy married life, while her older sister will be all alone by herself.  She sets out to find a husband for her.  When she sees her sister admire Utpal Dutt on television, she brings him into their lives.  Unfortunately, Utpal Dutt falls for Bindiya Goswami and isn't aware that Asha Parekh has fallen in love with him.  How Bindiya untangles herself from this situation and gets Utpal Dutt and Asha Parekh together forms the rest of the story.

Cast

Asha Parekh ... Neela
Mithun Chakraborty ... Ajay
Bindiya Goswami ... Deepa
Utpal Dutt ... Dr. Bhaskar
Deven Verma ... Guest Appearance

Crew

Director – Basu Chatterjee
Producer – Ramraj Nahta
Screenplay – Basu Chatterjee
Cinematographer – A. K. Bir
Editor – V. N. Mayekar
Costumes Designer – Leena Daru, Mani Rabadi
Choreographer – Oscar, Vijay
Music Director – Laxmikant–Pyarelal
Lyricist – Anand Bakshi
Playback Singers – Lata Mangeshkar, Amit Kumar, Anuradha Paudwal, Kishore Kumar, Shailendra Singh

Soundtrack
Laxmikant-Pyarelal has composed music with lyrics by Anand Bakshi.

External links
 

1979 films
1970s Hindi-language films
Films directed by Basu Chatterjee
Films scored by Laxmikant–Pyarelal